The 2018 Georgia Southern Eagles football team represented Georgia Southern University in the 2018 NCAA Division I FBS football season. The Eagles played their home games at Paulson Stadium in Statesboro, Georgia, and competed in the East Division of the Sun Belt Conference. They were led by first-year head coach Chad Lunsford. They finished the season 10–3, 6–2 in Sun Belt play to finish in third place in the East Division. They were invited to the Camellia Bowl where they defeated Eastern Michigan.

The Eagles had the biggest turnaround in FBS in 2018, going from a 2–10 record in 2017 to 10–3. They also set a new FBS record by losing only five turnovers during the season. The previous record of eight had been achieved by six teams, most recently by LSU in 2017.

Previous season
The Eagles fired head coach Tyson Summers six games into the season. He was replaced by interim head coach Chad Lunsford. They finished the season 2–10, 2–6 in Sun Belt play to finish in a tie for tenth place.

Following the season, interim head coach Chad Lunsford was promoted to head coach.

Schedule

Game summaries

South Carolina State

UMass

at Clemson

Arkansas State

South Alabama

at Texas State

at New Mexico State

Appalachian State

at Louisiana–Monroe

Troy

at Coastal Carolina

at Georgia State

vs. Eastern Michigan (Camellia Bowl)

Awards and honors

Preseason

Award watch lists
Listed in the order that they were released

Sun Belt coaches poll
On July 19, 2018, the Sun Belt released their preseason coaches poll with the Eagles predicted to finish in fourth place in the East Division.

Preseason All-Sun Belt Teams
The Eagles had six players selected to the preseason all-Sun Belt teams.

Offense

2nd team

Wesley Fields – RB

Ellis Richardson– TE

Curtis Rainey – OL

Defense

1st team

Logan Hunt – DL

Monquavion Brinson – DB
Tae Hayes – DB

Special teams

2nd team

Tyler Bass – K

Post-season finalists and winners

All-Sun Belt Selections

Twelve Georgia Southern football players were honored by the league coaches and members of the media as the Sun Belt Conference announced the selections for its all-conference teams.

Offensive Selection

Curtis Rainey - OL (First team)
Wesley Fields - RB (Second team)
Jeremiah Culbreth - OL (Second team)
Wesley Kennedy III - RB (Honorable mention)
Shai Werts - QB (Honorable mention)

Defensive Selection

Kindle Vildor - DB (First team)
Raymond Johnson- DL (Second team)
Monquavion Brinson - DB (Second team)
Logan Hunt - DL (Third team)
Rashad Byrd - LB (Honorable mention)
Ty Phillips - DL (Honorable mention)

Special Teams Selection

Tyler Bass - PK (First team)

per Sun Belt Conference

References

Georgia Southern
Georgia Southern Eagles football seasons
Camellia Bowl champion seasons
Georgia Southern Eagles football